Rashko Fratev (Bulgarian: Рашко Фратев; 23 January 1925 – 23 March 2016) was a Bulgarian equestrian who competed in the 1952 Summer Olympics and in the 1956 Summer Olympics.

References

1925 births
2016 deaths
Bulgarian male equestrians
Olympic equestrians of Bulgaria
Equestrians at the 1952 Summer Olympics
Equestrians at the 1956 Summer Olympics
20th-century Bulgarian people